Noah Bumper Crop 2022 In Sendai was a professional wrestling event promoted by CyberFight's sub-brand Pro Wrestling Noah. It took place on January 16, 2022, in Sendai, Japan, at the Sendai Sun Plaza. The event aired on CyberAgent's AbemaTV online linear television service and CyberFight's streaming service Wrestle Universe.

Storylines
The event featured seven professional wrestling matches that resulted from scripted storylines, where wrestlers portrayed villains, heroes, or less distinguishable characters in the scripted events that built tension and culminated in a wrestling match or series of matches.

Event
The event started with the confrontation between Kotaro Suzuki, Nosawa Rongai and Yo-Hey, and Aleja, Hao and Nio, solded with the victory of the preceding team. Next, Atsushi Kotoge and Hajime Ohara defeated Hayata and Yuya Susumu in tag team action. The third bout saw Daisuke Harada picking up a victory over Seiki Yoshioka in singles competition. In the fourth match, Daisuke Harada and Hao defeated Aleja and Nio after Hao turned on Kongo. Next, Sugiura-gun (Kazushi Sakuraba, Kazuyuki Fujita, Kendo Kashin and Takashi Sugiura) outmatched Funky Express (King Tany and Mohammed Yone), Go Shiozaki and Masakatsu Funaki in eighth-man tag team action. In the semi main event, Keiji Muto and Naomichi Marufuji marked their second defense of the GHC Tag Team Championship against Kenoh and Manabu Soya.

In the main event, Katsuhiko Nakajima marked his fourth successful defense in a row of the GHC Heavyweight Championship against Masa Kitamiya. After the match concluded, Najakima received a challenge from Kazuyuki Fujita.

Results

References

External links
Pro Wrestling Noah official website

Pro Wrestling Noah
CyberAgent
2022 in professional wrestling
December 2022 events in Japan
Pro Wrestling Noah shows